The MP 89 (French : Métro sur Pneus d'appel d'offres de 1989) is a rubber tired variant of electric multiple units used on the Paris Métro. Designed by Roger Tallon, two types are built by GEC-Alsthom for service on Lines 4 and 14, and will soon enter service on Line 6. The trains on Line 1 were moved to Line 4 between 2011 and 2013 to replace the older MP 59s, though only 48 trains are used for revenue service. The remaining four trains are stored either at Montrouge or Saint Ouen as operational spares.

Conception

In 1978, RATP possessed a large number of outdated Sprague-Thomson trains, many of which were rapidly approaching 60 and 70 years old. With the MF 77 trains in place along Lines 8, 9 and 13, most of the Sprague were replaced. However, there were still some trains in service along Line 9, which were approaching 80 years old. Those trains were finally retired in 1983, reducing the average age of rolling stock to 14 years. Anticipating further aging in its rolling stock, RATP changed its policy regarding replacement of rolling stock to avoid a massive, simultaneous replacement of all rolling stock.

September 28, 1990 marked the approval of the contract to manufacture the MP 89 trains by RATP for an order of 665 cars, with GEC- Alsthom being selected as the manufacturer. In 1994, a prototype MP 89 CA was built for testing at a facility on the Petite Ceinture(the name of this facility was BEPC, Base d'Essais de la Petite Ceinture), the former rail line that encircled Paris. A total of 52 trains for Line 1 and 21 trains for Line 14 were built, totaling 438 cars, fewer than the 665 cars mentioned in the contract. The first MP 89 CC trains went into service on Line 1 on March 27, 1997 and the MP 89 CA trains went into service on Line 14 on October 15, 1998.

The MP 89 class was developed initially when the need to replace the original rubber-tyred MP 55 cars of Line 11 was identified, and rolling stock was required for the new Line 14 as well as the anticipation of the extension of Line 1 into the La Défense business district. This was to be achieved by the construction of this new class of cars for Lines 1 and 14, with the cascading of refurbished MP 59 stock from Line 1 to lines 11 and 4. Two types were designed, the driverless MP 89 CA for the automated Line 14, and MP 89 CC for the then manually driven line 1. Both subclasses are visually similar except for the provision of a drivers cab in the outer end of the MP 89 CC cars. (from :fr:MP 89).

Description 

The MP 89 contains many features that are equipped in both subclasses. These innovative features made the MP 89 the first of its kind on the Metro and allowed the RATP to continue to equip its lines with the modernized stock.

Among many features, the MP 89 is the first class of rolling stock to include the automatic opening and closing of doors. Instead of a passenger having to pull a lever or push a button to open the door in order to enter or exit the train, all of the doors on the platform side open and close automatically. This is due to the fact that the lines using this material are predominantly underground. This feature was carried on by the MF 2000 and MP 05 rolling stock.

The MP 89 is also equipped with an audio and visual automatic system (AVSA Annonces Visuelles et Sonnores Automatiques) which automatically detects the positioning of the station platform (whether the platform is on the left, or on the right side of the train). This detection allows the automatic opening of the train doors on the appropriate side of the platform. The system also allows for the operation of automated station announcements. Instead of the conductor having to utilize the intercom to announce station names, the automated system does this automatically. On curved stations, this system is especially vital due to the gap between the train and the curved platform. Automated messages announce the presence of the curves.

For example; if an MP 89 CC train approaches the curved station of Barbès – Rochechouart on Line 4, there will be an automated announcement of the station name "Barbès – Rochechouart" just prior to the train entering the station. As the train approaches the platform and begins to slow down, a second station name announcement "Barbès – Rochechouart" is made. In the case that a platform is curved, a third announcement is made in French, English, and a third language (usually Spanish, German, or Italian) that alerts passengers to "Please mind the gap between the train and platform". The MP 89 CA does not utilize "mind the gap" announcements at the present time because none of the platforms on Line 14 are curved.

Another new feature of the MP 89 is the interconnecting gangways in between cars, which was achieved with the prototype BOA and later the MF 88. This is described further in the next section, because the type of gangway equipped differs between the CC and CA versions. The gangways were subsequently improved and equipped the later MF 2000 and MP 05 stock trains. (from :fr:MP 89).

Manually driven (CC) stock (Line 4 and 6)

The MP 89 CC is manually controlled by the driver and originally circulated on Line 1 from their inception in 1997 until February, 2013, replacing the aging MP 59 during the course of 1997 and 2000. The first train (#01) was delivered to the RATP in 1995 and was originally without articulation. Interconnecting gangways would not be installed until the train went into passenger service in 1997. 52 6-car trains were ordered for Line 1.

From 2006 to 2007, an experimental program ran on selected train-sets on an LCD passenger information system (Dilidam). This system would later be adopted by the new MP 05 automated rolling stock that now operate on Line 1 (from :fr:MP 89).

Besides the provision of a driver's cab on the CC version of the MP 89, another key difference between the CC and CA stock is the interconnecting gangways between trains. Most of the CC stock are equipped with reinforced gangways, which consists of solid interior panels. This was designed mainly due to fears that the curved platforms on Line 1 (such as Bastille), as well as storage of the trains within the tunnels, could cause significant damage to rubber gangways. However, some trains (#s 02, 08, 09, 13, 18, 51, and 52) have been fitted with rubber gangways since 2000, and six trains (#s 43, 45, 46, 48, 49, and 50) contain prototype gangways that were later implemented in the MF 01 stock (from :fr:MP 89). In 2012, train #12 was retrofitted with the MF 01 type gangways upon transfer of the train to Line 4, and in March, 2014, train #01 was retrofitted.

Because Line 4 is a much curvier line compared to Line 1, there were also concerns that the interconnecting gangways would become damaged from excessive wear and tear caused by the curvature of the tracks and stations. It was originally planned that all of the MP 89 CC trains would be re-fitted with the same rubber gangways as the MP 05. However, after modifying the Line 4 tracks to better suit the MP 89, the plan was cancelled.

Fully automated (CA) stock (Line 14)

The MP 89 CA operates on the Line 14, and is best known for being fully automatic without the use of any driver or cab. Similar to the Metropolis counterparts operating on Singapore's North East and Circle lines, the trains ends offer passengers an unblocked view of the tracks ahead. They do however have full driving facilities located behind a locked cabinet, for use in case of emergency or when the automatic drive is not adequate. 19 6-car sets were initially ordered, with a further 2 sets delivered for the extension of Line 14 from Madeleine to Saint-Lazare. All of the MP 89CA stock on Line 14 are equipped with rubber gangways.

Transfer of (CC) stock to Line 4 
Beginning in April 2011, and lasting through March 2013, the MP 89 trainsets on Line 1 were gradually transferred over to Line 4. This cascading process was initiated by the full automation of Line 1, which brought on board a new class of fully automated rolling stock, the MP 05. This in-turn, allowed the aging MP 59 trainsets on Line 4 to be retired.

In April, 2011, the MP 89 CC #01 was moved to Line 4, as work to fully automate Line 1 was nearing completion. The transfer of these trains to Line 4 will allow RATP to retire the MP 59 stock, which are reaching the ends of their useful lives. After various internal components (such as the automated station announcements) were updated to accommodate service on Line 4, train #01 went into service on May 23, 2011. Until September, 2011, train #01 was the only MP 89CC train to operate on Line 4. On September 10, 2011, train #44 went into service, marking the second train to be transferred. As the new MP 05 rolling stock began to debut on Line 1 during November, 2011, more MP 89 stock was put into service, allowing the RATP to transfer two to three trains per month.

By December 21, 2012, Line 1 had reached 100% automation, though three MP 89 trains, #s 02, 46, and 50, continued to operate as supplemental trains during rush hour. As of February 21, 2013, the MP 89 are no longer used on Line 1 and the MP 05 trains are now fully controlled by the central command centre and train spacing (SAET) instead of the signaling system that guided the MP 89 trains.

As of June, 2013, all 52 trains have been transferred over to Line 4. However, only 48 trains are used for revenue service (just as the MP 59s were). The remaining four trains are stored at either the garage behind the Mairie de Montrouge station, or at the Saint Ouen workshop as operational spares.

Formations

MP89 CC
  use trains in a 6-car formation (4M2T).

As of 05 March 2023, 29 six-car sets are allocated to Saint-Ouen Depot for use on Line 4, as shown below.

  will use trains in a 5-car formation (3M2T).

5 five-car sets were allocated to Paris Italie Depot for use (currently testing only) on Line 6, as shown below.

The last set, which is six cars long, is unassigned.

MP89 CA
  will use driverless trains in a 6-car formation (4M2T).

As of 04 March 2023, 17 six-car sets were allocated to St Ouen Depot for use on Line 4, as shown below.

  use driverless trains in a 6-car formation (4M2T).

The only train (CA16) is assugned at St Ouen Depot for use on Line 14, as shown below.

Future transfers 
New trains of the MP 14 series will replace the current fleet of Line 14, because of the extensions of the Grand Paris Express project. The current fleet of 21 MP 89 CA and 11 MP 05 trains will transfer to the newly-automated Line 4, where it will be joined by 20 MP 14 trains to meet the current peak vehicle requirements.

The 52 MP 89 CC trains that currently serve Line 4 would then be shortened from six to five cars, and transfer to Line 6 to replace the MP 73 trains. Line 6 currently has 47 MP 73 trains, meaning that Île-de-France Mobilités would be able to immediately start refurbishment on five MP 89 CC trains when they are released from service.

 Integrate the specific equipment kits predefined and supplied by the holder of the dedicated contract,
 integrate RATP equipment, Octys (improved autopilot) and video protection systems,
 replace all the seat upholstery
 carry out all electronic and electrical transformation operations,
 renovate the ceilings
 carry out the installation of the IDFM logos and on-board signalisation
 carry out functional tests (in progress for 4 trainset)

For the transfer only the technical modifications will be carried out. The aesthetic modifications and the modifications will be later. The RATP changing the 52 trainsets into 5 cars it will be able to carry out the renovation of 2 or 3 trains at a time without degrading the operation of the M6, reserves included.

As of October, 2021, one 5-car trainset is being used to conduct overnight testing on the 6.

Other networks 
The MP 89 CA has been operating on line M2 of the Lausanne Metro since 2008, with two-car trains instead of the six-car trains variant used in Paris (MP 89 TL).

The Santiago Metro uses a forked CC version named NS 93. These trains are essentially an upgraded version of the MP 89 trains, and operate in six and seven-car formations on the line 5 and eight-car formations on the line 1. The NS 93 is noticeably taller than the MP 89, to accommodate air conditioning.

Gallery

References

External links
 
 TRUCK (bogie)

Alstom multiple units
Articles containing video clips
Paris Métro rolling stock
Train-related introductions in 1997
Paris Métro line 4
Paris Métro line 14
Paris Métro line 6
750 V DC multiple units
Electric multiple units of France